Lepidiolamprologus attenuatus is a species of cichlid endemic to Lake Tanganyika preferring areas with sandy substrates in which it digs crater-shaped nests.  This species is carnivorous preying on fishes.  This species can reach a length of  TL.  It can also be found in the aquarium trade.

References

attentuatus
Fish of Africa
Taxa named by Franz Steindachner
Fish described in 1909
Taxonomy articles created by Polbot